Rushville Township is located in Schuyler County, Illinois. As of the 2020 census, its population was 2,419 and it contained 1,066 housing units.

Geography

Demographics

References

External links
City-data.com
Illinois State Archives
Census Reporter

Townships in Schuyler County, Illinois
Townships in Illinois